Events from the year 1918 in Mexico.

Incumbents

Federal government
President: Venustiano Carranza

Governors
 Aguascalientes: Aurelio L. González
 Campeche: Joaquín Mucel Acereto
 Chiapas: Manuel Fuentes A./Pablo Villanueva
 Chihuahua: Arnulfo González/Manuel Herrera Marmolejo/Ramón Gómez y Salas/Ignacio C. Enríquez/Andrés Ortiz
 Coahuila: Gustavo Espinoza Mireles
 Colima: Interim Governors
 Durango:  
 Guanajuato: Agustín Alcocer
 Guerrero: Francisco Figueroa Mata
 Hidalgo: 
 Jalisco: Emiliano Degollado/Manuel Bouquet, Jr.
 State of Mexico: Agustín Millán Vivero/Joaquín García Luna
 Michoacán: 
 Morelos: 
 Nayarit: José Santos Godínez
 Nuevo León: Nicéforo Zambrano
 Oaxaca: Juan Jiménez Méndez
 Puebla: Alfonso Cabrera Lobato
 Querétaro: Ernesto Perrusquía
 San Luis Potosí: Juan G. Barragán Rodríguez 
 Sinaloa: Ramón F. Iturbe
 Sonora: Plutarco Elías Calles
 Tabasco: Joaquín Ruiz/Luis Hernández Hermosillo/Heriberto Jara Corona
 Tamaulipas: Alfredo Ricaut/Andrés Osuna
 Tlaxcala:  
 Veracruz: Cándido Aguilar Vargas
 Yucatán: Salvador Alvarado Rubio
 Zacatecas:

Events
March 25 – Neville Ranch Raid
August 27 – Battle of Ambos Nogales

Births
April 28 – Ramón Valdiosera, designer, painter, writer, cartoonist (d. 2017).
November 20 – Lorenzo Servitje, businessman and philanthropist, co-founder of Grupo Bimbo (d. 2017)
 December 1: Alfredo Guati Rojo, watercolor artist (d. June 10, 2003)
Date unknown: Jacinto Adriano Wong Romero; Progreso, Yucatán Catholic priest (d. 2018)

Deaths

References

 
Years of the 20th century in Mexico
Mexico